Kamel Muhyieddeen كامل محي الدين  (1928 – 14 July 1984) was a political figure of Palestinian descent. He was the Minister of State and Minister of Agriculture for the country Jordan.

Career

He worked in the Agricultural Cooperative Society and then as a consultant. He became a deputy in the Parliament of Jordan, representing the Governorate of Amman. He was a member of the Jordan First Committee and a member of the Jordanian Parties Committee. He served as a senator in the parliament of Jordan from 1963 through 1966. In 1969 he was the governor of the capital of Jordan, Amman. Muhyieddeen served as a Governor in Abu Dhabi in the 1970s. Speaking for the Jordanian government, Muheddeen rejected calls for a binational state and unilateral declaration of statehood. At a news conference, Muheddeen stated, "We accept a Palestinian state on the borders of 1967, with Jerusalem as its capital, the release of Palestinian prisoners, and the resolution of the issue of refugees." 
He served as a senator in the parliament of Jordan from 1963 through 1966.

Palestinian statehood 
Speaking for the Jordanian government, Muhyieddeen rejected calls for a bi-national state and unilateral declaration of statehood.

At a news conference, Muhyieddeen stated, "We accept a Palestinian state on the borders of 1967, with Jerusalem as its capital, the release of Palestinian prisoners, and the resolution of the issue of refugees."

Death 
Muhyieddeen had a host of health issues and died at the age of 56 from kidney failure on July 14, 1984, in his birthplace of Deir Debwan, Ramallah, Palestinian territory.

See also 
 Cabinet of Jordan

References

External links 
 Prime Ministry of Jordan website

Government ministers of Jordan
Agriculture ministers of Jordan
Construction ministers of Jordan
Labor ministers of Jordan
1928 births
1984 deaths